Alexei Kozlov may refer to:
 Alexei Kozlov (businessman) (born 1974), Russian businessman in the construction sector
 Alexei Kozlov (figure skater) (born 1979), Estonian figure skater
 Aleksei Anatolyevich Kozlov (born 1986), Russian footballer
 Aleksei Kozlov (footballer, born 1975), Russian footballer
 Aleksei Kozlov (footballer, born 1999), Russian footballer
 Aleksei Kozlov (musician) (born 1935), Russian musician
 Alyaksey Kazlow (born 1989), Belarusian footballer
 Alexey Kozlov (intelligence officer) (1934–2015), Russian intelligence officer